Zamarada aureomarginata is a moth of the family Geometridae first described by Arnold Pagenstecher in 1907. It is found in south west Madagascar.

It has a wingspan of 15 mm.

References

Abraxini
Moths of Madagascar
Moths of Africa